Agnes and His Brothers is a 2004 film directed by Oskar Roehler.

Plot 
Three very different siblings: Hans-Jörg, a librarian who is a sex addict; Werner, a politician in a troubled marriage with a son who enjoys discrediting his father; Martin, who is now Agnes after having a gender-reassignment operation. Agnes works as a dancer and is suffering from unrequited love.

Cast 
 Martin Weiß as Agnes Tschirner
 Moritz Bleibtreu as Hans-Jörg Tschirner
 Herbert Knaup as Werner Tschirner
 Katja Riemann as Signe
 Tom Schilling as Ralf
 Suzan Anbeh as Desiree
 Vadim Glowna as Günther
 Margit Carstensen as Roxy
 Lee Daniels as Henry
 Marie Zielcke as Nadine
 Oliver Korittke as Rudi
 Martin Semmelrogge as Manni Moneto
 Martin Feifel as Hannes
 Sven Martinek as Jürgen
 Til Schweiger as Freund in Bibliothek

Reception

References

External links
 Official website 
 
 Agnes and His Brothers at filmportal.de/en

2004 films
2004 drama films
2004 LGBT-related films
2000s German-language films
German LGBT-related films
Films directed by Oskar Roehler
Films scored by Martin Todsharow
German drama films
Films shot in Cologne
LGBT-related drama films
Films about trans women
2000s German films